Jonesboro School District (or Jonesboro Public Schools (JPS)) is a school district headquartered in Jonesboro, Arkansas.

Schools

Secondary schools
 High schools
 Jonesboro High School—1982-83 National Blue Ribbon School
 Junior high schools
 Annie Camp Junior High School—1982-83 National Blue Ribbon School
 Douglas MacArthur Junior High School—1982-83 National Blue Ribbon School

Primary schools
 Elementary schools
 Jonesboro International Studies Magnet School (formerly the Sixth Grade Academic Center)
 Jonesboro Visual and Performing Arts Magnet School (formerly Hillcrest Elementary School)
 Jonesboro Math and Science Magnet School (formerly Philadelphia Elementary School)
 Jonesboro Health/Wellness & Environmental Studies Magnet School (formerly South Elementary School)
 Jonesboro MicroSociety Magnet School (formerly West Elementary School)
 Kindergarten and PreK
 Kindergarten Center
 Jonesboro Pre-K Program

Former schools:
 Booker T. Washington High School

References

External links

 

Jonesboro, Arkansas
School districts in Arkansas
Education in Craighead County, Arkansas